For highways numbered 388, see List of highways numbered 388
For the fictional planet from Metroid, see Metroid#Games